Emlichheim is a Samtgemeinde ("collective municipality") in the district of Bentheim, in Lower Saxony, Germany. Its seat is in the municipality Emlichheim.

The Samtgemeinde Emlichheim consists of the following municipalities:

 Emlichheim
 Hoogstede 
 Laar 
 Ringe 

Samtgemeinden in Lower Saxony